Gogia is a genus of primitive eocrinoid blastozoan from the early to middle Cambrian.

G. ojenai dates to the late Early Cambrian; other species come from various Middle Cambrian strata throughout North America, but the genus has yet to be described outside this continent.  Notable localities where species are found include the Wheeler Shale of Utah, and the Burgess Shale of British Columbia.

The species of Gogia, like other eocrinoids, were not closely related to the true crinoids, instead, being more closely related to the blastoids.
 
Gogia is distinguished from sea lilies, and most other blastoids, in that the plate-covered body was shaped like a vase, or a bowling pin (with the pin part stuck into the substrate), and that the five ambulacra were split into pairs of coiled or straight, ribbon-like strands. Six specimens of Gogia are known from the Greater Phyllopod bed, where they comprise < 0.1% of the community.

As a whole, the Eocrinoids are regarded as basal blastozoans very close to the ancestry of the entire subphylum.

References

External links

Burgess Shale fossils
Burgess Shale animals
Cambrian echinoderms
Blastozoa genera
Cambrian genus extinctions
Wheeler Shale
Paleozoic life of Alberta